Gas Dream is a studio album by American hip hop artist Eligh, a member of the indie hip hop collective Living Legends. It was released in 2000.

Critical reception
Matt Conaway of AllMusic gave the album a rating of three stars out of five. He wrote, "Eligh is at a crossroads artistically with Gas Dream, as he is torn between the joy of making music to satisfy his creative urges while simultaneously having to deal with industry politics."

Track listing

References

External links
 
 Gas Dream at CD Universe
 Gas Dream at Underground Hip Hop

2000 albums
Eligh albums